Museumand: The National Caribbean Heritage Museum is a group that celebrates the contribution of British African-Caribbean people to life in the United Kingdom. The group is a "museum without walls" based in Nottingham, and who work with communities there and elsewhere, including mounting exhibitions in museums, universities and other places. It was founded in 2015 by Catherine Ross as the SKN (Skills Knowledge and Networks) cultural museum.

In 2020 the group made plans to publish a book 70 Objeks & Tings telling the story of the "Windrush generation" through their familiar objects and other aspects of their daily lives. The book is to be printed in 2021 but  some sections are available online.

The group's founder, Catherine Ross, is its director and her daughter Lynda-Louise Burrell is its creative director. Ross came to the UK in 1958 from Saint Kitts at the age of seven.

References

External links

Ethnic museums in the United Kingdom
Museums in Nottingham